Martial Payot (18 February 1900 – 13 October 1949) was a French skier. He competed at the 1924 Winter Olympics and the 1928 Winter Olympics.

References

External links
 

1900 births
1949 deaths
French male cross-country skiers
French male ski jumpers
French male Nordic combined skiers
Olympic cross-country skiers of France
Olympic ski jumpers of France
Olympic Nordic combined skiers of France
Cross-country skiers at the 1924 Winter Olympics
Ski jumpers at the 1924 Winter Olympics
Nordic combined skiers at the 1924 Winter Olympics
Cross-country skiers at the 1928 Winter Olympics
Ski jumpers at the 1928 Winter Olympics
Nordic combined skiers at the 1928 Winter Olympics
People from Chamonix
Sportspeople from Haute-Savoie
20th-century French people